Robert Ailshie (February 16, 1908 – November 16, 1947) was an American attorney and politician from Idaho who served as the state's 20th attorney general for less than eleven months in 1947. His father, James Ailshie (1868–1947), was a justice on the Idaho Supreme Court for 24 years, with several stints as chief justice.

Personal life 
Elected attorney general in November 1946, Ailshie died at age 39 of a heart attack at home; his mother had died a week earlier and his father less than six months prior. His brother James Jr. (1900–1938), a former U.S. attorney, also died of a heart attack in his late thirties, nearly a decade earlier.

References 

1908 births
1947 deaths
Idaho Attorneys General
Idaho lawyers
People from Boise, Idaho
People from Coeur d'Alene, Idaho
University of Idaho alumni
Harvard Law School alumni